George Howard Wilson (August 21, 1905 – July 16, 1985) was an American attorney, FBI agent,  U.S. Representative from Oklahoma, and judge.

Early life and education
Born in Mattoon, Illinois, Wilson moved with his parents in 1910 to Enid. There he attended Enid Public Schools. He graduated from Phillips University in 1926. He studied at the University of Michigan Law School in 1926 and 1927, and graduated from the law school of the University of Oklahoma in 1929. He was admitted to the bar in 1928 and joined his father's law practice in 1929 in Enid, Oklahoma.

Career

Military service
During World War II, Wilson ranked as Colonel within the Judge Advocate General's Department of the United States Army, serving overseas in the South Atlantic Theater of Operations from 1942 to 1946.

Congressional term
Wilson was elected as a Democrat to the 81st Congress (January 3, 1949 – January 3, 1951).  During his term, Wilson was on the Committee on Interstate and Foreign Commerce, and the Subcommittee on Public Health, Science, and Commerce. With his colleagues he was tasked with considering legislation for a national health program, and toured western Europe for investigation purposes. In 1950, he lost his election bid for the 82nd Congress.

Legal and judicial career

Wilson served as a deputy district court clerk of Garfield County, Oklahoma in 1928. He was a special agent with the Federal Bureau of Investigation from 1934 to 1938. From 1939 to 1942, he was the city attorney of Enid, Oklahoma. Following his congressional service he directed the Oklahoma State Crime Bureau in 1951. Wilson was an Oklahoma Supreme Court justice from 1952 to 1968, Chief judge of State Administrative Zone No. 1 in 1967, district judge, 1969, and Chief judge, Division No. 1, Judicial District No. 4. Judge Wilson served as President of the Oklahoma Judicial Conference in 1968.

Personal life and Death

He had four children with wife Myrna Kathryn Reams, whom he married in 1929. He continued to reside in Enid, Oklahoma until his death on July 16, 1985, and was interred in Memorial Park Cemetery.

References

George H. Wilson Collection and Photograph Series at the Carl Albert Center

1905 births
1985 deaths
Politicians from Enid, Oklahoma
Phillips University alumni
University of Michigan Law School alumni
University of Oklahoma College of Law alumni
Oklahoma lawyers
United States Army colonels
United States Army personnel of World War II
Federal Bureau of Investigation agents
Oklahoma state court judges
People from Mattoon, Illinois
Democratic Party members of the United States House of Representatives from Oklahoma
20th-century American lawyers
20th-century American politicians
20th-century American judges
Military personnel from Illinois